Legislative elections were held in Åland on 19 October 2003 to elect members of the Lagtinget. The 30 members were elected for a four-year term by proportional representation. Though the Åland Centre recorded its worst results to date in the elections, it regained its status as the largest party on Åland, beating out the Liberals for Åland by a mere 10 votes. The Åland Social Democrats had one of its best election results ever, doubling its representation in the Lagting.

Following the elections, the previous government formed by Åland Centre and the Liberals for Åland, was replaced by one comprising the Åland Centre, Liberals for Åland, Åland Social Democrats and Freeminded Co-operation parties.

Results

References

External links
Parties and Elections in Europe
Legislative Assembly elections

Elections in Åland
Aland
2003 in Finland
October 2003 events in Europe